Kashan River is the left tributary of Murghab River in the Central Asian states of Afghanistan and Turkmenistan.

History 
Kashan River flows into Badghis province, northwest of Afghanistan on the northern side of the Selseleh-ye Safīd Kūh (ancient name: Paropamisus ). From the north it flows to Turkmenistan and into the Murghab River close to Tagtabazar.

References 

Murghab basin
Rivers of Asia
Rivers of Afghanistan
Rivers of Turkmenistan
Geography of Badghis Province
Mary Region